Sandvika Fjordturer is a passenger ferry operator in Oslofjord in Viken county, Norway. The company operates from Kadettangen outside of Sandvika to the islands of Borøya, Brønnøya, Ostøya and Langåra on contract with Ruter, serving route 711. The company operates the ferries M/S Rigmor and M/S Rigfar, the first being the oldest wooden ferry in regular scheduled traffic in Norway. The company has 40,000 passengers annually. Kadettangen is served by the lines 705 and 706 of the Ruter bus network. The nearest railway station is Sandvika.

References

Shipping companies of Norway
Ferry companies of Viken
Companies based in Bærum
Transport in Bærum
Companies with year of establishment missing